The Hermitage Bridge is an ancient, single-arch stone pedestrian bridge crossing the River Braan near Dunkeld, Perth and Kinross, Scotland. A Category A listed structure, it is in the bounds of The Hermitage, a National Trust for Scotland-protected site.

The bridge was built by order of John Murray, 3rd Duke of Atholl, presumably to gain access across to some lands leased from Sir John Stewart of Murthly, as well as assisting with the views of the Black Linn Falls. It has since become a major landscape feature and has been the subject of several paintings and sketches, including from George Washington Wilson's visit around 1859.

An arch (added around 1785) stands across the western entrance, while underneath its eastern end, the bridge contains a small arch giving access to the ledge below Ossian’s Hall and to a small grotto.

Gallery

See also
List of listed buildings in Dunkeld And Dowally, Perth and Kinross

References

External links
"The Hermitage Dunkeld Scotland" – Alan Stewart, YouTube, 28 February 2017

Category A listed buildings in Perth and Kinross
Listed buildings in Dunkeld
Listed bridges in Scotland
Bridges across the River Braan
Stone bridges in Scotland
Bridges completed in 1770
1770 establishments in Scotland
Bridges in Perth and Kinross